Jorge Casanova may refer to:

 Jorge Casanova (footballer, born 1976), Uruguayan football midfielder and manager
 Jorge Casanova (footballer, born 1984), Venezuelan football midfielder